Burton Township is an inactive township in Howard County, in the U.S. state of Missouri.

Burton Township was erected in 1880, taking its name from the community of Burton, Missouri.

References

Townships in Missouri
Townships in Howard County, Missouri